The 1980 United States Senate election in Florida took place on November 4, 1980, alongside other elections for President of the United States as well as to the United States Senate in other states and elections to the United States House of Representatives and various state and local elections. Incumbent Democratic U.S. Senator Richard Stone ran for re-election to a second term, but lost the Democratic primary election to Bill Gunter. Republican Paula Hawkins defeated Gunter in the general election.

Democratic primary

Candidates 
 John B. Coffey
 Bill Gunter, Florida State Treasurer and former U.S. Representative
 Buddy MacKay, State Senator
 James L. Miller
 Richard A. Pettigrew
 Richard Stone, incumbent U.S. Senator

Campaign 
Stone, a freshman Senator, had a reputation for changing his mind. In 1980, the AFL-CIO actively campaigned against him, and Stone was deemed vulnerable in his re-election bid.  Six Democrats entered the race for Stone's seat including his 1974 runoff opponent Bill Gunter who was Florida State Treasurer/Insurance Commissioner in 1980.  As was the case in 1974, Stone and Gunter were forced into a runoff but, unlike 1974, Gunter won the nomination.

Results

Republican primary

Candidates 
 Ander Crenshaw, former State Representative
 Lewis Dinkins
 Louis Frey Jr., former U.S. Representative
 Paula Hawkins, Florida Public Service Commissioner
 Ellis Rubin, criminal defense attorney
 John T. Ware, State Senator

Results

General election

Candidates 
 Bill Gunter (D), Florida State Treasurer and former U.S. Congressman
 Paula Hawkins (R), Florida Public Service Commissioner

Results

See also 
 1980 United States Senate elections

References 

Florida
1980
1980 Florida elections